Md. Niamatullah is a Bangladesh Nationalist Party politician and the former Member of Parliament of Dhaka-12.

Career
Niamatullah was elected to parliament from Dhaka-12 as a Bangladesh Nationalist Party candidate in 1991.

References

Bangladesh Nationalist Party politicians
Living people
5th Jatiya Sangsad members
Year of birth missing (living people)
6th Jatiya Sangsad members